Thoroughbreds Don't Cry is a 1937 American musical comedy film directed by Alfred E. Green and starring Mickey Rooney and Judy Garland in their first film together.

Plot
Cricket West is a hopeful actress with a pair of vocal cords that bring down the house. Her eccentric aunt runs a boarding house for the local jockeys, whose leader is the cocky but highly skilled Timmie Donovan, famous for his daring come-from-behind wins in the stretch. Into their lives comes Sir Peter Calverton and his young grandson Roger Calverton, who are titled but cash poor with only one asset, a prize-winning stakes horse called The Pookah.

Donovan's the best there is at his profession, but he is fatally compromised because his no-good gambler of a father, Charles D. Brown, pretending he is at death's door, extorts a pledge from Donovan to throw the prep race The Pookah is running in, in order to obtain cash for a "cure". Donovan does it but then is warned by the stewards that they're suspicious of his actions.

When The Pookah lost the race, the stress was too much for Sir Peter, and he died of a heart attack.  Roger hasn't the money to enter The Pookah in The Cup, and is planning to sell him.  But Cricket tracks down Donovan he has an attack of conscience and snatches the entrance fee from his conniving father.  Roger wins the American Cup and Donovan's father is arrested.

Cast
 Mickey Rooney as Timmie Donovan
 Judy Garland as Cricket West
 Sophie Tucker as Mother Ralph
 C. Aubrey Smith as Sir Peter Calverton
 Ronald Sinclair as Roger Calverton
 Forrester Harvey as Wilkins
 Charles D. Brown as 'Click' Donovan 
 Frankie Darro as 'Dink' Reid 
 Henry Kolker as 'Doc' Godfrey 
 Helen Troy as Hilda 
 Francis X. Bushman as Racing Steward (uncredited) 
 Robert Homans as Police Officer Higgins (uncredited)

Production
Following the sensational audience reaction to Judy Garland singing "You Made Me Love You (I Didn't Want to Do It)" to a picture of Clark Gable in Broadway Melody of 1938 (1937), Garland was rushed into shooting two films back to back, this and the more musically elaborate Everybody Sing, which was held for later release in 1938.

This was the first film to team Mickey Rooney and Judy Garland. Arthur Freed and Nacio Herb Brown wrote two songs for Garland, but only one, "Got A Pair of New Shoes", made it into the final film. "Sun Showers" was also recorded by Garland, which still survives today.

Ronald Sinclair substitutes for Freddie Bartholomew, for whom this role was originally intended, but whose voice had changed, according to accounts later told by Judy Garland. The chemistry between Mickey and Judy was readily apparent in this film and MGM would team them several more times until Words and Music in 1948. The film features a cameo appearance from Frankie Darro as Dink Reid.

Box office
According to MGM records the film earned $426,000 in the US and Canada and $305,000 elsewhere resulting in a loss of $29,000.

References

External links
 
 
 
 

1937 films
1937 musical comedy films
American musical comedy films
American horse racing films
Films directed by Alfred E. Green
Metro-Goldwyn-Mayer films
Films produced by Harry Rapf
American black-and-white films
1930s American films